Pseudancistrus guentheri is a species of catfish in the family Loricariidae. It is native to South America, where it was initially collected from an unknown locality in Guyana, although it has subsequently been reported from the confluence of the Mazaruni River and the Cuyuni River near the village of Kartabo. The species reaches  in length.

References 

Loricariidae
Fish of Guyana
Fish described in 1904
Taxa named by Charles Tate Regan